Frances Chung may refer to:

Frances Chung (poet), American poet
Frances Chung (dancer), Canadian dancer